Suliman Arcua Minnawi, known as "Minni Minnawi" (born December 12, 1968 in Furawiyya, North Darfur), is a Sudanese politician who was the leader of the largest faction of the Sudanese Liberation Army. A former educator, Minnawi was the Secretary of Sudan Liberation Army leader, Abdul Wahid Nur, before the organisation split in 2004.
Minnawi signed a treaty, known as the Darfur Peace Agreement, with the Khartoum government in May 2006. Nevertheless, in July 2006, fighting broke out around the North Darfur town of Korma, resulting in the deaths of at least 80 people. 
In the same year, Minnawi was appointed the top Sudanese official in the Darfur region, as chairman of the Transitional Darfur Regional Authority, and was technically the fourth ranking member of the Presidency, as Senior Assistant to the President of the Republic. 

On September 14, 2006, in defiance of Khartoum's opposition, Minnawi supported the new UN peacekeeping force detailed in UNSC Resolution 1706, which was designed to protect the Sudanese people.  Minnawi opposed the Sudan government's genocidal agenda, which was exercised by Bashir against the Zaghawa, and other Black African citizens, for which crimes Bashir was later indicted by the International Criminal Court (ICC).

In December 2010, after repeated complaints of non-compliance by the National Congress Party with the peace accords, the Sudan Liberation Movement withdrew from the Darfur Peace Agreement. Minnawi resigned as Senior Assistant to the President of Sudan and as Chairperson of the Transitional Darfur Regional Authority, to merge his faction, SLM/MM, with the other resistance defense forces in Darfur, including SLM/AW, Abdul Wahid, in resisting attacks by the Sudanese Armed Forces, and its militia, on citizens in rebel-held areas. In 2011, SLM/MM joined the Sudan Revolutionary Front (SRF) opposed to the Khartoum Government.

In May 2021, Minni Minnawi was appointed governor of the Darfur Regional Government. He was inaugurated on 10 August.

References 

1968 births
Living people
People from North Darfur
Zaghawa people
People of the War in Darfur
Sudanese rebels